Two vessels of the British Royal Navy have been named HMS Sesame:

  was an  launched in 1918 and scrapped in 1934–1936
  was an Assurance-class rescue tug torpedoed and sunk by a German E-boat off Normandy, France in June 1944

Royal Navy ship names